Miriam Elizabeth Grealey (born 27 December 1965) is an Irish former cricketer who played as an all-rounder, batting right-handed and bowling right-arm off break. She appeared in one Test match and 79 One Day Internationals for Ireland between 1987 and 2005. She was the first woman to score 1,000 runs in ODIs for Ireland.

Her ODI high score came in 2000, when she hit 101 against Pakistan. In 2017, she was one of two women inducted into the Cricket Writers' Hall of Fame. She is also an Honorary Life Member of the MCC, the first Irish citizen to be so honoured.

References

External links
 
 

1965 births
Living people
Ireland women Test cricketers
Ireland women One Day International cricketers
Irish women cricket captains
Irish cricket coaches